"Phantom Bride" is a song by American alternative metal band Deftones, appearing on the band's eighth studio album Gore. The song was released as the album's fourth and final single. The song features a guitar solo performed by Jerry Cantrell from Alice in Chains.

According to vocalist Chino Moreno, guitarist Stephen Carpenter wrote the song by himself, aside from the lyrics and drums.

Belching Beaver released a year-round IPA beer named after the song in 2016.

Charts

References

2016 songs
2016 singles
Deftones songs
Songs written by Chino Moreno
Songs written by Jerry Cantrell
Songs written by Stephen Carpenter
Songs written by Abe Cunningham
Songs written by Frank Delgado (American musician)
Songs written by Sergio Vega (bassist)
Space rock songs